The onion model is a graph-based diagram and conceptual model for describing relationships among levels of a hierarchy, evoking a metaphor of the layered "shells" exposed when an onion (or other concentric assembly of spheroidal objects) is bisected by a plane that intersects the center or the innermost shell. The outer layers in the model typically add size and/or complexity, incrementally, around the inner layers they enclose.

An onion diagram can be represented as an Euler or Venn diagram composed of a hierarchy of sets, A1...Ak (but perhaps potentially or conceptually infinite) where each set An+1 is a strict subset of An (and by recursion, of all Am where in each case m > n). (Some applications of the concept, however, may fail to benefit from the mathematical and otherwise rigorous properties of the model.)

Such formats supported by Microsoft PowerPoint's SmartArt wizard invoke the term "stacked Venn".

In computing

The onion model in computing is used as a metaphor for the complex structure of information systems. The system is split into layers to make it easier to understand. A simple example is to start with the program, operating system and hardware layers. Each of these layers can then be subdivided.

See also
 
 Matryoshka doll

References

Diagrams
Scientific models